Peter Akinlabi (born 28 August 1973) is a Nigerian table tennis player. He competed in the 2000 and 2004 Summer Olympics.

References

External links
 

1973 births
Living people
Table tennis players at the 2000 Summer Olympics
Table tennis players at the 2004 Summer Olympics
Nigerian male table tennis players
Olympic table tennis players of Nigeria
Sportspeople from Lagos